Oreina speciosa is a species of broad-shouldered leaf beetles of the family Chrysomelidae, subfamily Chrysomelinae.

This alpine leaf beetle lives in the Pyrenees, Massif Central, Jura, Vosges, Alps, Apennines and Balkans.

The colours of the elytra of this beetle are very variable, with varieties completely blue, purple, black or else bright metallic green crossed by longitudinal blue or red (or both) stripes.

It can be found on various Apiaceae species, mainly of the genus Laserpitium, Heracleum, Chaerophyllum, Peucedanum and Angelica. The activity period is June–August.

Subspecies
O. speciosa bosniaca Apfelbeck, 1912
O. speciosa excellens Weise, 1907
O. speciosa ganglbaueri Jakob, 1953
O. speciosa huberi Bechyné, 1958
O. speciosa lugdunensis Weise, 1907
O. speciosa pretiosa Suffrian, 1851
O. speciosa pseudoliturata G. Müller, 1916
O. speciosa speciosa (Linnaeus, 1767)

References
 Bontems, C., 1981 - Les especes de Linne et Fabricius du genre Oreina Chevrolat, 1837 (Col. Chrysomelidae, Chrysomelinae) - Nouv. Rev. Ent. 11: 93-109
 Host-Plant Switches and the Evolution of Chemical Defense and Life History in the Leaf Beetle Genus Oreina. In: Evolution. 50, Nr. 6, Dezember 1996
 Triponez, Y., 2011 - Discordances between phylogenetic and morphological patterns in alpine leaf beetles attest to an intricate biogeographic history of lineages in postglacial Europe. - Mol.Ecol.20(11): 2442-2463

External links
 Biolib
 Culex.biol.uni.wroc.pl
 Fauna Europaea

Chrysomelinae
Beetles of Europe
Beetles described in 1767
Taxa named by Carl Linnaeus